Elections for the Indian state of Jammu and Kashmir were held over September–October 1996. Farooq Abdullah became Chief Minister of Jammu Kashmir after the elections. The 1996 Lok Sabha elections and assembly elections in the state were possible due to efforts of counter-insurgents like Kuka Parray, (head of Ikhwan-ul-Muslemoon).

Background
The National Conference, which had boycotted the 1996 Indian general election, agreed to participate in the 1996 Assembly elections only after Prime Minister, H. D. Deve Gowda, promised "maximum autonomy" for Jammu and Kashmir.

Results

In the 1996 assembly elections, 14 women contested, 10 of whom lost their deposits, while 2 were elected. National Conference won 57 out of 86 seats. BSP contested first time on 29 seats in the state and won 4 seats. BJP rose from two seats in 1987 to 8 seats in 1996.

Elected Members

References

Jammu and Kashmir
1996
1996
1996 in Indian politics